Mission Top Secret is an Australian TV series aired between 1992 and 1995.

The pilot for the series was a 1991 telemovie of the same name. This was part of the South Pacific Adventure series on a budget of $1 million.

At the APRA Music Awards of 1994 won Best Television Theme.

Premise 
This Australian TV series is about an organization known as the Centauri Network, it is a network of children from around the planet who fight crime, & solve mysteries with the help of gadgets, which were quite advanced for the time.

When 12-year-old Jemma accidentally taps into a disused telecommunications satellite she finds that she has audio-visual contact with other computers worldwide. Then with the help of electronics inventor, Sir Joshua Cranberry, she forms the Centauri Network, a worldwide crime fighting organisation of children who use their network. Jemma is the daughter of Sir Joshua's assistant. Their primary enemy was one persistent individual, Neville Savage, who is some sort of criminal mastermind. The inventor, Sir Joshua Cranberry, is the uncle of the Wiggins' twins, who are the primary protagonists in Season One.

Cast
 Jennifer Hardy as Victoria Wiggins (series 1)
 Andrew Shephard as Albert Wiggins (series 1)
 Deanna Burgess as Jemma Snipe (series 1)
 Rossi Kotsis as Spike Baxter (series 1–2)
 Shane Briant as Neville Savage (series 1–2)
 Fred Parslow as Sir Joshua Cranberry (series 1–2)
 Emma Jane Fowler as Sandy Weston (series 1–2)
 Jamie Croft as David Fowler (series 2)
 Lauren Hewett as Kat Fowler (series 2)

Episodes
Series 1
 The Falling Star (episodes 1.01 - 1.04)
 Eagles from the East (episodes 1.05 - 1.08)
 The Mona Lisa Mix-Up (episodes 1.09 - 1.12)
 The Treasure Of Cala Figuera (episodes 1.13 - 1.16)
 The Polish Pony Puzzle (episodes 1.17 - 1.20)
 The Flight Of The Golden Goose (episodes 1.21 - 1.24)

Series 2
 The Crown Jewels Are Missing (episodes 2.01 - 2.04)
 The Return Of The Dinosaur (episodes 2.05 - 2.08)
 The Golden Voice (episodes 2.09 - 2.12)
 The Treasure Of Elephant Ridge (episodes 2.13 - 2.16)
 The Emperor's Pearl (episodes 2.17 - 2.20)
 The Toymaker (episodes 2.21 - 2.24)

References

External links 
 Australian Television Information Archive
 

Network 10 original programming
APRA Award winners
Australian children's television series
Australian drama television series
1992 Australian television series debuts
1995 Australian television series endings